John Spencer Trimingham (17 November 1904 – 6 March 1987) was a noted 20th-century scholar on Islam in Africa.
Trimingham was born in Thorne to John William Trimingham and Alice Ventress. In Jerusalem (1932) Trimingham married Wardeh, who died in 1980.

Trimingham studied social sciences at Birmingham University, Arabic and Persian at Oxford University, and trained for the ministry of the Church of England at Wells Theological College. He served with the Church Missionary Society in the Sudan, Egypt, and West Africa (1937–53) and travelled extensively carrying out detailed studies of Islam in Africa. He first published on Arabic and on the Christian approach to Islam, later on the history of Islam in Africa and Sufi orders.
Subsequently, he was reader in Arabic and head of the Department of Arabic and Islamic Studies at Glasgow University (1953–64) and a visiting professor in the department of history at the American University of Beirut (1964–70). He then moved to the faculty of the Near East School of Theology in Beirut.

Triminghan died in 1987 in Lingfield.

Works
 Sudan colloquial Arabic. 2nd. rev. ed., London, 1946
 [https://archive.org/details/in.ernet.dli.2015.500767The Christian approach to Islam in the Sudan]. London, Oxford University Press, 1948
 Islam in the Sudan. London, Oxford University Press, 1949
 Islam in Ethiopia. London, Oxford University Press, 1952
 Islam in West Africa. Oxford, Clarendon Press, 1959
 A history of Islam in West Africa. London, Oxford University Press, 1964
 Islam in East Africa. Oxford, Clarendon Press, 1964. (Repr. New York,)
 The influence of Islam upon Africa. London, Longmans, 1968
 The Sufi orders in Islam. Oxford, Clarendon Press, 1971. 
 Two worlds are ours. A study of time and eternity in relation to the Christian Gospel freed from the tyranny of the Old Testament reference. Beirut, Librairie du Liban, 1971
 Christianity among the Arabs in pre-Islamic times. London, Longman, 1979.

References

External links
Scanned copy of the entire book  Islam in the Sudan (failed OCR)

British scholars of Islam
Islam in Africa
1904 births
1987 deaths
Alumni of Wells Theological College
Alumni of the University of Birmingham